Rump steak is a cut of beef. The rump is the division between
the leg and the chine cut right through the aitch bone. It may refer to:

 A steak from the top half of an American-cut round steak primal
 A British- or Australian-cut steak from the rump primal, largely equivalent to the American sirloin

American and British equivalencies
The British and Commonwealth English "rump steak" is commonly called "sirloin" in American English. On the other hand, British "sirloin" is called short loin or "porterhouse" by Americans.

French usage
Rump steak corresponds roughly to the French cut culotte (literally 'britches').

The pointe de culotte, the rump cap is highly recommended for braising as bœuf à la mode.

In the 20th century the English term rump steak was adopted, although with modified orthography romsteak or romsteck.  The spelling rumsteak is also attested.

See also 

 Steak

References

External links 

Cuts of beef